Naigaon is an village located in the Palghar district of Indian State of Maharashtra.  It is linked by the Versova Bridge /Ghodbunder Bridge to Navghar village, which is connected from the east side of the settlement by the National Highway.

References

Villages in Palghar district
Vasai-Virar